The 2015–16 season is the 48th season of the Northern Premier League Premier Division, and the ninth season of the Northern Premier League Division One North and South. 
The League sponsors for 2015–16 are Evo-Stik.

Premier Division

The Premier Division featured six new teams:
Colwyn Bay, relegated from Conference North
Darlington 1883, promoted via play-offs from NPL Division One North
Hyde United, relegated from Conference North and changed name from Hyde
Mickleover Sports, promoted as champions of NPL Division One South
Salford City, promoted as champions of NPL Division One North
Sutton Coldfield Town, promoted via play-offs from NPL Division One South

League table

Play-offs

Semi-finals

Final

Results

Stadia and locations

Division One North

Division One North featured three new teams:

Glossop North End, promoted as champions from the North West Counties League Premier Division
Trafford, relegated from the NPL Premier Division
Witton Albion, relegated from the NPL Premier Division

League table

Play-offs

Semi-finals

Final

Results

Stadia and locations

Division One South

Division One South will feature five new teams:
Basford United, promoted as champions from the Midland League Premier Division
Belper Town, relegated from the NPL Premier Division
Daventry Town, transferred from the Southern League Division One Central
Rugby Town, transferred from the Southern League Division One Central
Shaw Lane Aquaforce, promoted as champions from the Northern Counties East League Premier Division

League table

Play-offs

Semi-finals

Final

Results

Stadia and locations

Challenge Cup

The 2015–16 Northern Premier League Challenge Cup, known as the 15–16 Integro Doodson League Cup for sponsorship reasons, is the 46th season of the Northern Premier League Challenge Cup, the main cup competition in the Northern Premier League. It will be sponsored by Doodson Sport for a fifth consecutive season. 68 clubs from England will enter the competition, beginning with the preliminary round, and all ties will end will end after 90 minutes and conclude with penalties. Due to weather damage to pitches in late December, two ties were reversed.

The defending champions were Warrington Town, who defeated Farsley on penalties in the 2015 Final. Warrington Town were unable to defend their title as they were eliminated in the first round by Ramsbottom United.

Calendar

Preliminary round
Eight teams from the Northern Premier League Division One North or Northern Premier League Division One South have to compete in the preliminary round to win a place in the competition proper. The draw for this round was made on 10 July 2015.

Source:

First round
Teams that were not in the preliminary round from Northern Premier League Division One North or Northern Premier League Division One South entered at this stage as well as teams from the Northern Premier League Premier Division, along with the winners from the preliminary round. The draw for this round was made on 10 July 2015.

Source:

Second round
The 32 winners from the first round were entered into the second round draw on 12 November 2015. The ties are originally scheduled to be played between 30 November and 2 December.

Source:

Third round
The 16 winners from the second round were entered into the third round draw on 20 January 2016. The ties are originally scheduled to be played between 9  and 16 February.

Source:

Quarter-finals
The 8 winners from the third round were entered into the Quarter-final draw on 17 February 2016. The ties are originally scheduled to be played between 1 and 15 March.

Source:

Semi-finals
The 4 winners from the Quarter-finals were entered into the Semi-final draw on 9 March 2016. The ties are originally scheduled to be played on 22 March and 26 April.

Source:

Final
The Challenge Cup Final was played at Throstle Nest, the home ground of Farsley Celtic. This was Scarborough Athletic's first final appearance (Scarborough  won in 1977) and the sixth final appearance for Marine (their most recent appearance was in 2003 where they defeated Gateshead).

Source:

See also
2015–16 Isthmian League
2015–16 Southern League

References

External links
Official website

Northern Premier League seasons
7